Pineridge is a neighbourhood in Northeast Calgary, Alberta, Canada, and is one of four neighbourhoods that make up what is called the Properties, along with Whitehorn, Temple, and Rundle. It is bordered by 32 Ave NE to the north, 52nd Street NE to the west, 16th Avenue NE (Highway 1 – the Trans Canada Highway) to the south, and 68th Street NE to the east.

History
Pineridge was established in 1974 and was developed along with the other "Properties" communities during the building boom of the mid-1970s. Prior to that time the area was a treeless prairie landscape.

The community of Pineridge is located close to Calgary's Northeast commercial and industrial areas and major transportation routes, including the Trans-Canada Highway, Barlow Trail and Memorial Drive. The Village Square Leisure Centre is situated within the community, and the city's pathway system offers recreational opportunities for local residents.

Demographics

Residents in this community had a median household income of $49,452 in 2000, and there were 17.9% low income residents living in the neighbourhood. As of 2000, 29.2% of the residents were immigrants. 17.5% of the buildings were condominiums or apartments, and 32.4% of the housing was used for renting.

Schools

Pineridge is home to the following schools:
 Pineridge Community Preschool
 St. Patrick Elementary School (Separate)
 Douglas Harkness Elementary School (Public)
 Lester B. Pearson High School (Public)
 Pineridge Community School (Public)
 Clarence Sansom Junior High School (Public)

Public transit
Pineridge is serviced by the following Calgary Transit routes (as of 1 January 2006):
 Route 34, Pineridge
 Route 48, Rundle
 Route 66, Blackfoot Express
 Route 90, Foothills North
 Route 176, 52 St. Express
The nearest CTrain rapid transit station to Pineridge is Rundle Station.

Electoral districts
The Pineridge community is a part of the Calgary-Northeast federal electoral district, the Calgary Cross provincial constituency. It is represented in the Calgary City Council by the Ward 5 councillor.

See also
List of neighbourhoods in Calgary
Village Square Leisure Centre
 Lester B. Pearson High School

References

External links
Pineridge Community Association

Neighbourhoods in Calgary